"Bouncybob" is a song by Dutch DJs and record producers Martin Garrix, Justin Mylo and Mesto. It was released as a free download on 31 December 2015.

Music video
A music video to accompany the release of "Bouncybob" was first released onto YouTube on 31 December 2015 at a total length of three minutes and thirty-nine seconds. It features an animated pro DJ controller dancing to the beats of the track.

Charts

Release history

References

2015 singles
2015 songs
Martin Garrix songs
Justin Mylo songs
Songs written by Martin Garrix